Vasilena Gerginova Stefinova-Amzina (29 June 1942 – 19 December 2017) was a Bulgarian middle-distance runner. She competed in the women's 800 metres at the 1972 Summer Olympics.

References

External links
 

1942 births
2017 deaths
Athletes (track and field) at the 1972 Summer Olympics
Bulgarian female middle-distance runners
Olympic athletes of Bulgaria
Sportspeople from Sofia
21st-century Bulgarian women
20th-century Bulgarian women